Crosserlough, historically known as Cros Ar Loch, is a large civil parish in southern County Cavan, in the province of Ulster, Ireland. It is located between Ballyjamesduff and Lough Sheelin.

The parish consists of three areas. Kilnaleck, which is a village, Drumkilly and Crosserlough. The latter is a small settlement at the northern edge of the eponymous townland.

Facilities
There are three schools in the parish, Kilnaleck, Drumkilly and Crosserlough. There are three Catholic Churches in Crosserlough, St Mary's Church (the Parish Church) in the townland of Cullow, in the Crosserlough area. This church was built in 1888. There is also a Church of Ireland church at Kildrumferton.

There are five pubs, three grocery shops, a post office, a pharmacy, two off-licences (attached to pubs), a butcher's shop, a garage, barbers, drapery shop, a number of takeaway restaurants, a hairdresser, beautician, car dealership and approximately 30 houses in Kilnaleck.

John Comiskey, a Chicago-based Democratic politician, and father of Charles Comiskey, owner of the Chicago White Sox in the early part of the 20th century, was born here in 1826 and emigrated to the US in the mid-19th century.

Sport
Sportspeople from Crosserlough parish won seven Gaelic Athletic Association senior championships in a row during the 1970s. All-Ireland winner Mick Higgins (1922–2010), spent his youth in Crosserlough. Crosserlough have always played at senior level, the only team to do so in the county. Crosserlough also have a Camogie team.

Crosserlough is also home to Innyvale Athletic Club.

History

The historical sites in Crosserlough include a dolmen in Duffcastle, and one in Kildrumferton. There is a mass rock from the time of the Penal Laws in Lehery and there are several ring forts throughout the parish. Kill Cemetery is associated with a number of legends, including the shooting of a priest for saying mass during the Penal era.

There are over 70 townlands in Crosserlough.

References

Civil parishes of County Cavan